Cortinicara is a genus of beetles in the family Latridiidae, containing the following species:

 Cortinicara afghana Johnson, 1977
 Cortinicara andersoni (Blackburn, 1891)
 Cortinicara baronowskii Johnson, 1989
 Cortinicara bhutanica Johnson, 1977
 Cortinicara biloba Rücker, 1984
 Cortinicara blatchleyi Johnson, 1989
 Cortinicara carinifrons Johnson, 1990
 Cortinicara conferta (Reitter, 1879)
 Cortinicara corpulenta (Motschulsky, 1866)
 Cortinicara fukiensis Johnson, 1990
 Cortinicara gibbosa (Herbst, 1793)
 Cortinicara hirtalis (Broun, 1880)
 Cortinicara luzonica Johnson, 1989
 Cortinicara meridiana Johnson, 1975
 Cortinicara vagepunctata (Broun, 1914)

References

Latridiidae genera